Piketon High School is a public high school in Piketon, Ohio, USA. It is the only high school in the Scioto Valley Local School District. The nickname is the Redstreaks.

Athletics
Piketon High plays in the Scioto Valley Conference.

Notes and references

External links
 School website

High schools in Pike County, Ohio
Public high schools in Ohio